Paradise, California is an incorporated town in Butte County, California

Paradise, California also refers to:
Paradise, Mono County, California
The former name of Shively, California